Spirit of Peoria is a riverboat that normally runs in the Peoria, Illinois area on the Illinois River watershed. The boat participated in the 2004 Grand Excursion. Spirit of Peoria is a true paddleboat, actually using its paddlewheel for propulsion, unlike some modern riverboats with purely cosmetic wheels.

The boat was designed by architect Alan Bates, and built in 1988 at the Walker Boat Yard in Paducah, Kentucky, making it the first paddleboat vessel built there. The propulsion system was designed by Norm Rittenhouse, with steering by Custom Hydraulics.

Spirit of Peoria has no propellers or thrusters, and is powered by twin Caterpillar 3412 diesel gensets, producing 700 kilowatts combined in 208 volt 3-phase voltage. The AC power is rectified to DC which in turn powers two locomotive traction motors, which drive the paddlewheel via two  by  chains. The dry weight is about 275 tons, with a passenger capacity of 385.

The regular area of travel of the boat ranges from Pere Marquette State Park near Grafton, Illinois to Starved Rock State Park near Ottawa, Illinois. The boat is owned and captained by G. Alex Grieves, and co-captained by Alice Grady and Dylan Masonholder.

As of April 2022, The Sprit of Peoria has been sold and is no longer docked in Peoria, IL. The sternwheeler has sailed up the Illinois and Mississippi Rivers to La Crosse, WI, where she will join the Julia Belle Swain.  Both boats will undergo repairs and renovations and will ultimately operated together at a location that is yet unknown.  Both boats are owned by Troy Manthey, President and CEO of Yacht Starship Cruises. Troy is a 5th generation Streckfus family member.  https://en.wikipedia.org/wiki/Streckfus_Steamers

See also
 Julia Belle Swain

References

External links

 Spirit of Peoria website

Peoria, Illinois
Paddle steamers of the United States
Ships built in Kentucky
Illinois River
1988 ships
Tourist attractions in Peoria, Illinois